A two-part referendum  was held in Guam on 4 August 1979. A proposed new constitution was rejected by 82% of voters, whilst a law introducing the death penalty was rejected by 53% of voters. In August 1987 a referendum was held on another proposed constitution, with each chapter voted on separately. Two chapters (I and VII) were rejected by voters, resulting in a second referendum in November in which both were approved.

Background
On 21 October 1976 the United States Congress had approved the establishment of Constitutional Councils for Guam and the United States Virgin Islands. In December 1976 the Guamanian Legislature decided to hold an election for the Council.

In 1978 US President Jimmy Carter approved the proposed 14-chapter constitution, and a referendum was scheduled for 7 November. However, following a dispute over the gubernatorial election, it was postponed until 1979.

Results

References

1979 referendums
1979 in Guam
Referendums in Guam
Constitutional referendums
Capital punishment